Jeff Mayweather (born July 4, 1964) is an American former professional boxer who competed from 1988 to 1997, and held the IBO super featherweight title from 1994 to 1995. He has since worked as a boxing and mixed martial arts trainer.

Professional career

Mayweather had a career boxing record of 32–10–5 (10 KOs). His biggest accomplishment was winning the IBO junior lightweight title from John Roby on April 21, 1994, a title which he defended two times. On March 13, 1993, Mayweather lost to Oscar De La Hoya, who was in only his 5th pro bout, by TKO in round 4.

Boxing
After a successful career in the ring, Mayweather followed in the footsteps of his brothers and became a trainer.  Known as the "Quiet Mayweather" Mayweather has trained several champions including Sultan Ibragimov, Celestino Caballero and for a short period Floyd Mayweather Jr.

On October 14, 2011, he led Caballero down to Argentina where they captured the WBA featherweight title from Jonathon Barros. Jeff Mayweather is current boxing coach for Pakistani Boxer Muhammad Waseem who is known to be Pakistan's first professional boxer to have ever held a WBC title. He is the Current WBC Silver Flyweight Champion.

Internet ventures 

Mayweather has also launched a website called "Jeff Mayweather's Pro Boxing Insider". He says it will allow boxing fans to get an inside look at the sport, and will have several boxers serve as active contributors.  The site also boasts a forum that allows fans to ask questions of the fighters. Mayweather was team adviser for internet personality KSI's 2nd YouTube boxing match against fellow internet personality Logan Paul.

Personal life
He is a member of the Mayweather boxing family: his brothers are former welterweight contender Floyd Mayweather Sr. and two-division world champion Roger Mayweather, and his nephew is five-division world champion Floyd Mayweather Jr.

Mayweather attended Ottawa Hills High School, in Grand Rapids, Michigan as a member of the  class of 1981.

While Mayweather pursued a degree in Graphic Arts from Western Michigan University in Kalamazoo, Michigan, he competed in the 1987 National Golden Gloves.

Mayweather has indicated he has diabetes, which he currently treats using "traditional methods".

Professional boxing record

See also
Notable boxing families#United States

References

External links

Boxers from Michigan
Sportspeople from Grand Rapids, Michigan
Super-featherweight boxers
Light-welterweight boxers
Lightweight boxers
1964 births
Living people
American boxing trainers
American male boxers
International Boxing Organization champions